Natela Svanidze  (4 September 1926 – 17 November 2017) was a Georgian composer.

Biography
Natela Svanidze was born in Akhaltsikhe, Georgia. She studied composition at Tbilisi State Conservatoire with Andria Balanchivadze, graduating in 1951. She was awarded the title of Honored Artist of Georgia in 1981.

Svanidze died on 17 November 2017, at the age of 91.

Works
Svanidze composes for orchestra, chamber ensemble, solo instrument and experimental performances. Selected works include:
 
1949 – "Symphony Dances" for orchestra
1951 – "Samgori" symphony poem
1963 – "Kvarkvare" symphony poem
1965 – "Burlesque" for piano, wind and percussion instruments
1967 – Symphony for piano, string and percussion instruments
1968 – Symphony-ballet for symphony orchestra
1983 – Symphony No. 2
1954 – "Garden of Kartli" cantata for mixed chorus and symphony orchestra. (in three parts), text by Giorgi Leonidze
1970 – "Pirosmani" chamber oratorio for reader, contralto, male sextet and instrumental ensemble (in five parts), texts by Boris Pasternak, Pavel Antokolsky, Titsian Tabidze
1975 – "Poem of Never-to-be-forgotten" oratorio for reader, female sextet, two choruses, organ, violin, 12 cellos, flute and tape (in six parts), text by Irakli Charkviani
1956 – Improvisation for violin and piano
1960 – "Fairytale" eight variations for piano
1972 – "Circle" piece for two prepared pianos
1952 – "Zoia" ballade for bass and piano, text by Ioseb Noneshvili
1954 – "Daybreak" for female chorus a cappella, text by Giorgi Orbeliani

References

1926 births
2017 deaths
20th-century classical composers
20th-century women composers
21st-century classical composers
21st-century women composers
Classical composers from Georgia (country)
People from Akhaltsikhe
People's Artists of Georgia
Tbilisi State Conservatoire alumni
Women classical composers